Selections from the Writings of Kierkegaard is a 1923 book about Søren Kierkegaard by the American scholar Lee M. Hollander. Its publication marked a significant turning-point in American and English language philosophy, as it introduced English translation excerpts of Kierkegaard's philosophy to America and other English-speaking countries.

References

External links
 Selections from the Writings of Kierkegaard at the Internet Archive

1923 non-fiction books
Philosophy books
Works about Søren Kierkegaard